The 2014 ConIFA World Football Cup was the first edition of the ConIFA World Football Cup, an international football tournament for states, minorities, stateless peoples and regions unaffiliated with FIFA organised by ConIFA and a successor of Viva World Cup, last held in 2012. The tournament was hosted by FA Sápmi in the Sápmi region, with all games held in the city of Östersund in Sweden.

Tournament
Twelve teams took part in the tournament. Catalonia and Rapa Nui were thought to be potential participants, but ultimately declined or withdrew.

Hosts
In May 2013 ConIFA announced that Sápmi had been chosen to host the inaugural ConIFA World Football Cup in Östersund, Sweden. It was an invitational tournament played between 1 and 8 June 2014, with all matches being held in the 6626-capacity Jämtkraft Arena.

In parallel with the tournament, a festival celebrating the cultural diversity of the teams involved was held in Östersund.

Participants
The twelve participating teams were drawn into the four groups of three teams each for the group stage. In preparation for this, the teams were organised into three pots. The draw was made by ConIFA World President Per-Anders Blind in Östersund on 24 March 2014.

Of the twelve invited teams, eight had previously participated at the Viva World Cup.

Withdrawals
The draw initially placed Quebec in Group C and Zanzibar in Group D. However, in May 2014, it was announced that both Quebec and Zanzibar had withdrawn from the tournament. The Quebec team had affiliated with the Fédération de soccer du Québec, with the intention that the FSQ eventually apply for membership of CONCACAF. To this end, the team will only play internationals against full national teams that are members of either CONCACAF or FIFA, and will no longer participate in Non-FIFA Football. The Zanzibar team were unable to obtain visas to enter Sweden and were thus forced to pull out of the tournament. Quebec's place was taken by South Ossetia, while Zanzibar were replaced by County of Nice.

Matches

Group stage

Group A

Group B

Group C

Group D

Knockout stage

Quarter-finals

Semi-finals

Third-place play-off

Final

Placement round

Placement round 1

Placement round 2

Final Positions

See also
Viva World Cup

References

External links
Official website

CONIFA World Football Cup
International association football competitions hosted by Sweden
2014 in Swedish football
Sports competitions in Östersund
May 2008 sports events in Europe
June 2008 sports events in Europe